The following lists events that happened during the 1660s in South Africa.

Events

1660
 The Dutch East India Company imports the first horses into the Cape from Batavia
 Jan Danaert leads a horseback expedition from the Cape settlement to the east and reaches what he names the Olifants River 
 Pieter Everaert leads an unsuccessful horseback expedition from the Cape settlement to the north in an attempt to locate the land of the Namaqua

1661
 Pieter Cruythoff is sent out from the Cape settlement to investigate the suitability of the interior for agriculture

1662
 7 May - Jan van Riebeeck leaves the Cape on promotion to a position on the Council of Justice in Batavia 
 9 May - Zacharias Wagenaer succeeds Van Riebeeck as Commander of the Cape

1663
 4 March - the Prince Edward Islands were discovered by Barent Barentszoon Lam of the Dutch East India Company ship Maerseveen, and named them Maerseveen (Marion) and Dina (Prince Edward).
 Settler outposts are established in the Hottentots Holland and Saldanha Bay areas

1664
 26 August - Isbrand Goske arrives at the Cape as Commissioner, and was instructed to select a site for the Castle of Good Hope

1665
 18 August - The first Dutch Reformed Church congregation is founded at the Cape and J. van Arkel is appointed the first minister

1666

 Settlements in Saldanha Bay and Vishoek are established
 The first Calvinist church built in the Cape
 2 January - Work commenced on a fortress, known as the Castle of Good Hope, which replaced the previous wooden fort built by Jan van Riebeeck and his men
 24 October - Cornelis van Quaelberg is appointed Commander of the Cape

1667
 The first Malays arrive as slaves

1668
 Hieronimus Cruse explores the southeast coast as far as Mossel Bay
 16 June - Jacob Borghorst is appointed Commander of the Cape

Births

Deaths
 1662 - Doman and Autsumao, leaders of the Khoikhoi and interpreters dies 
 1668 - Zacharias Wagenaer, Commander of the Cape, dies

References

See Years in South Africa for list of References

History of South Africa